W. & C. French, also known just as French, was a civil engineering company based at Buckhurst Hill in south-west Essex.

History
The business of Messrs W. and C. French was established by William French and his brother Charles French in 1870.

Second World War
In the Second World War it constructed many RAF airfields and also built Mulberry harbour units.

Public company
On 19 September 1949 it became a public company, when the Chairman of the company was Charles Samuel French, the son of William French. Another director was Brigadier John Linnaeus French CB CBE (18 November 1896 - 12 March 1953), a former commander of Colchester Garrison, and brother of Charles. Its transport depot was at Loughton. They had other depots at Colchester and Wisbech and carried out most of its work in East Anglia. The company was acquired by Kier Group in 1973.

Major projects

 The Coronation Channel at Spalding, Lincolnshire on the River Welland completed in 1953
 BOAC maintenance depot (now British Airways) at Heathrow Airport completed in 1955
 Hanningfield Reservoir completed in 1957
 London Heliport completed in 1959
 Queen Elizabeth II Reservoir (Walton South Reservoir) completed in 1962
 New facilities at New Hall, Cambridge completed in 1965
 Grafham Water completed in 1965
 Wraysbury Reservoir completed in 1971
Covenham Reservoir completed in 1978

Roads
 M18 Thurcroft (M1) to Wadworth (A1 M) completed 1967
 M6 Carnforth to Farleton completed 1970
 M6 Farleton to Killington completed 1970
 M62 Pole Moor to Outlane completed 1970
 M62 Outlane to Hartshead completed 1972
 M62 Pollington to Rawcliffe completed 1975
 M23 Hooley to Merstham completed 1975
 M11 Redbridge to Loughton completed 1975
 A12 Ufford to Wickham Market completed 1976

Airfields
 RAF Alconbury
 RAF Balderton
 RAF Bassingbourn
 RAF Boxted
 RAF Debden
 RAF Downham Market
 RAF Graveley
 RAF Knettishall
 RAF Langham
 RAF Mildenhall
 RAF Rivenhall
 RAF Thurleigh
 RAF Wyton

References

Sources

Construction and civil engineering companies of England
Companies based in Essex
Epping Forest District
Construction and civil engineering companies established in 1931
British companies disestablished in 1973
1931 establishments in England
1973 disestablishments in England
British companies established in 1931
Companies formerly listed on the London Stock Exchange
1973 mergers and acquisitions
Construction and civil engineering companies established in 1870
British companies established in 1870